Enter is the debut studio album by Russian Circles.  It was released on Flameshovel Records on May 16, 2006.  The band's use of fade off at the end of each song allows the album to flow continuously. All tracks first appeared on their self-titled EP, with the exception of "Micah" and "Enter."

Track listing

Personnel
 Mike Sullivan − guitar
 Colin Dekuiper − bass
 Dave Turncrantz − drums
 Greg Norman − engineering
 Dan Stout − mastering
 Rob Lowe − piano, mellotron, listening and instrument lending
 Jonathan Krohn − album design

References

2006 albums
Russian Circles albums